Kathryn Hunt is an American archaeologist and paleopathologist specializing in paleo-oncology, the multidisciplinary study of cancer in human history.

Early life and education 
Hunt grew up in Anchorage, Alaska. She studied anthropology and classical studies at the Pacific Lutheran University (PLU), graduating in 2011. She then obtained a Master's of Science in paleopathology from Durham University.

Hunt's fascination with archaeology dates back to her childhood in Alaska, where she never missed an episode of National Geographic. Kathryn studied archaeology during her time at PLU. Here, she became interested in Egyptology, which inspired her to sign up on a whim for a dig in Egypt along the Nile Delta. While participating in this dig, she was able to excavate remains of Egyptian royalty from areas surrounding the Valley of the Kings.

In 2009, aged 22, Hunt was diagnosed with a rare and aggressive form of ovarian cancer. This occurred during her junior year at PLU. Around the same time as her diagnosis, Hunt's aunt passed away from ovarian cancer. Before she passed away, Kathryn's aunt reminded her "my cancer is not your cancer", inspiring her to continue to fight her own battle with her cancer, although her aunt had lost hers. She later entered remission after over 2 months of chemotherapy and surgery to remove more than 20 benign tumors from her abdomen. Just 2 months after this, Hunt returned to classes, even embarking on a trip to return to the Valley of the Kings shortly after. This experience moved Hunt towards researching the global history of cancer.

Academic career 
Since beginning her studies, Hunt and colleagues have documented 272 cases of ancient cancer in the Cancer Research in Ancient Bodies (CRAB) Database. Previously, researchers had suggested that cancer was a modern day illness that did not affect people in historical times. However, through the field of paleo-oncology, research has shown that the first case of cancer documented in humans occurred 1.5 million years ago.  By researching ancient texts, Hunt has found sources referencing to cancer as an illness by ancient Egyptians. She has even found records of ancient cancer treatments such as pharmacopoeia, surgery, cauterization, and fasting. These texts also listed many different plants used as a remedy to cancer, including spurge, which is similar to a castor bean, and Ecballium elaterium, also known as the squirting cucumber. Finding textual evidence of cancer inspired Hunt to pursue physical evidence of cancer. She began studying bones as the primary method for identifying cancer. Often, there are lesions present on the bones from the cancer metastasizing from other regions of the body. After abnormalities in the bone are recognized by researchers, further analysis can be done to understand more about the lesions. This can be done with microscopic analysis or through radiographs.

Aside from her achievements within the field, Hunt has been a vocal advocate for the expansion of the field itself, generating both awareness and interest for the fairly new subject of paleo-oncology. Many scientists in the field of bio-archaeology tend to focus research on things such as infectious diseases and other frequent public health indicators. Paleo-Oncology is a very diverse field, requiring help from scientists of all specialties, including evolutionary biologists, archaeologists, geneticists, oncologists, and many more. Part of Hunt's purpose for studying ancient cancer is to help the scientific community to better understand the history of various forms of the disease, including potentially unknown causes and treatments. Hunt has conducted studies all around the world, including the time she spent conducting archaeological excavation and research in Egypt's Valley of Kings, Israel's Jezreel Valley, and with Transylvania Bioarchaeology. Hunt's ultimate goal is to establish a standard methodology for diagnosis of cancer in bones. In order to do this, Hunt along with help from Jennifer Willoughby, Casey Kirkpatrick, and Roselyn Campbell, launched an organization called the Ancient Cancer Foundation (ACF).  One of Hunt's ultimate goals is to help build a foundation for which paleo-oncological research can progress—based in methodological discussion, multidisciplinary collaboration, and open access to information.

Hunt co-founded the Paleo-Oncology Research Organization (PRO) in 2012 with colleagues Casey Kirkpatrick (Western Ontario University), Roselyn Campbell (University of California Los Angeles), and Jennifer Willoughby (Western Ontario University), which later becoming a subsidiary of the Ancient Cancer Foundation (ACF). The organization is a multidisciplinary institution that facilitates research into the global history of cancer (paleo-oncology) and open circulation of that information to the researchers as well as the public. Paleo-oncological research has been consistently growing and requires the contributions of historians, linguists, and scientists alike to further the world's understanding of cancer's historical development. The Paleo-Oncology Research Organization is working to list evidence of cancer in an online database to aid future paleo-oncologists in diagnosis of cancer in bones. It is also the hope of Hunt and her fellow researchers that this database will aid present and future scientists in their studies on how cancer has changed and evolved through time. This research will likely be aided by developments and advances in DNA analysis.

Professional career 
Kathryn Hunt currently holds the position of human osteologist on the Jezreel Valley Research Project. She is also an assistant director of the Jucu de Sus Necropolis excavation and field school which she works with alongside Transylvania Bioarchaeology. Hunt is also a co-founder and creative director of the Paleo-Oncology Research Organization (PRO).

Excavations that Hunt has participated in during her career include an archaeological excavation for Penn State's Mendes Expedition and an excavation for PLU Valley of the Kings Expedition in Egypt.

Honors and awards 
After forming PRO, Hunt was awarded a TED fellowship, and was named one of Fast Company's Most Creative People of 2014, one of OZY's Rising Stars, and one of Foreign Policy's Leading Global Thinkers.  She has also been featured on Business Insider.

References

External links
Paleo-oncology Research Organization
Ancient Cancer Foundation

"It’s In Our Genes: A Survivor’s Quest To Unearth Ancient Patterns Of Cancer" Fast Company
"Searching for the history of cancer in ancient human bones" TED Ideas
"KATHRYN HUNT, UNLOCKING CANCER'S ANCIENT PAST" OZY.com
Kathryn Hunt, for unearthing cancer's secrets" Foreign Policy Magazine

Living people
American archaeologists
Pacific Lutheran University alumni
Paleopathologists
Alumni of Ustinov College, Durham
Year of birth missing (living people)
American women archaeologists
21st-century American women